The GST distribution dispute is an ongoing political controversy concerning the distribution of goods and services tax (GST) revenue amongst the Australian states and territories. The dispute was originally based upon Western Australia's (WA) dissatisfaction with its low returns, which led to reform in 2018. As a result of the state's improved financial position during the COVID-19 pandemic, debate has since centred around the suitability of the minimum payments floor introduced as the original solution, and several states have begun inquiries.

Background 

The GST system was originally legislated by the Howard Government in 1999 and introduced in 2000. It is a value-added tax set at 10% of the price of most goods and services sold in the country. Upon its introduction, it replaced several state taxes as part of a broader taxation reform.

In Australia, GST revenue is distributed between the states and territories according to a principle of horizontal fiscal equalisation (HFE). The HFE system is designed to equalise revenue between the states and remedy fiscal imbalance. Recommendations for the rate of return for each state and territory are made by the Commonwealth Grants Commission (CGC), originally with the goal of provision of equal quality government services between all states. Thus, revenue raised through GST is paid to a central pool before being distributed between the states and territories in order to equalise spending capabilities.

Origins 

Western Australia's budget is supported in large part by resource royalties. The GST return received by WA was relatively steady from 2000 to the mid-2000s, taking its first plunge as the iron ore and gas boom began and resource taxes rose dramatically. To account for the rise in resource royalties revenue, the CGC began to reduce WA's GST share and increase the share of other states and territories. It was during this time that the state's criticism of HFE first began. By 2010, the share was around 70 cents per dollar, and this continued to decline over the next decade.

WA ran in deficit for much of the 2010s, and Liberal Premier Colin Barnett consistently blamed these deficits on a lack of GST revenue, particularly given the state's GST share fell at the same time as iron ore royalties. This was due to the "lag" in the HFE system, since the CGC considered royalties on a three-year basis. The state had accumulated debt of around A$30 billion by the financial year 2016–17. That year, the state ran a budget deficit of $3.9 billion. In 2016–17, $4 billion of WA's GST revenue had been distributed to other states. Liberal Prime Minister Malcolm Turnbull subsequently committed to implementing a GST floor to ensure a minimum rate of return for all states, but said it would not be implemented until WA's share had risen to around 75 cents in the dollar under the HFE system, which was not projected to occur for at least another four years. The commitment was heavily criticised by the state Labor opposition, who argued no time frame had been provided.

Change in state government 

By 2017 the existing system had resulted in a situation in which WA was paid approximately 34 cents for every dollar of GST raised. The next lowest share was received by New South Wales (NSW), who received approximately 88 cents in the dollar, with the highest sharing being the 466 cents to the dollar paid to the Northern Territory.

The newly-elected McGowan Government in WA had been relying upon a GST payment of 38 cents to the dollar to help return the state budget to surplus by 2019–20 financial year. Although 34 cents in the dollar was an improvement on the 2016–17 rate of approximately 30 cents in the dollar, the reduction left the state with $241 million less than expected for the 2017–18 state budget. State treasurer Ben Wyatt called the situation a "joke" and requested a top-up payment of $226 million, claiming the state was "in the fourth year of what is effectively a domestic recession". Then-federal treasurer Scott Morrison said he would consider the request for additional payments. Government senator for WA Dean Smith also weighed in, calling HFE "terminally diseased".

However, Turnbull again stated that no floor would be introduced until WA's share had been raised to between 70 and 75 cents to the dollar under the HFE system, which was not projected to occur for at least four years. He added that no change could occur without the agreement of other states and territories, which Premier Mark McGowan claimed was false given the CGC was a federal body. Crossbench senator for Queensland Pauline Hanson said she would be happy to support a reduction in Queensland's payments to improve WA's share, but backtracked when asked to clarify her comments by the Queensland state government.

The GST distribution was expected to become a political issue for the upcoming federal election, which was due to be held in 2019.

A review of the HFE system by the Productivity Commission was requested by Morrison in April 2017. A draft copy of the report was released in October, recommending that WA's share rise by $3.2–3.6 billion at the expense of all other state and territory shares. This provoked a vigorous reaction from South Australian Premier Steven Marshall, who said the state would not support any change that would reduce South Australia's share.

Morrison directed the Productivity Commission to undertake a second review of the HFE system in May 2017. Victoria made a submission to the Commission opposing any changes to the distribution system. The report was handed down in May 2018, and recommended that the returns should be determined so as to allow for states to provide "a reasonable (rather than the same) standard" of infrastructure and services. However, the federal government decided to use the payments made to Victoria and NSW as the benchmark for future payments, offering a series of top-up payments to WA that would not come from the existing GST pool but from federal revenue.

Introduction of GST floor 
The federal government announced its final model in July 2018. The plan, which began in 2019–20, consisted of a floor of 70 cents per dollar in the financial year 2022–23, rising to 75 cents in the dollar from 2024–25. The federal government would add additional federal funds to the GST pool to smooth the transition through to 2026–27, to make a "no worse-off guarantee" that no state or territory would have its share fall during this time. The WA government called the plan "compensation" for the state's previous low shares, and stated the new formula would ensure its return to a budget surplus.

At the 2019 federal election, the government campaigned on its GST solution in WA, as many of the state's sixteen seats were under threat from the opposition.

Dissatisfaction with payments floor 
WA recorded very low levels of infections by both national and international standards during the COVID-19 pandemic, allowing the state to live under only limited restrictions compared to the lockdowns seen in the eastern states. This resulted in little disruption to the state's economy relative to other states and territories, and combined with substantially increased iron ore royalties (one of the state's main exports that saw a substantial price rise in 2020 and 2021) led to the state recording the only surplus in the nation: $5.8 billion in 2020–21.

On 4 August 2021, the Victorian Legislative Assembly established a public inquiry into the state's "share of federal GST funding". The governments of Tasmania, the Australian Capital Territory, and South Australia all made submissions opposing the new model of distribution, while WA made a submission supporting the reform. The inquiry tabled its report on 10 March 2022, concluding that WA was being unfairly advantaged over the other states and territories, and called for a return to the HFE system.

NSW Liberal Treasurer Dominic Perrottet called McGowan the "Gollum of Australian politics" and demanded a review of the GST floor; Victorian Treasurer Tim Pallas claimed the GST formula was being "manipulated" in WA's favour at the expense of the other states, and suggested the federal parties' support for the reform was intended to win support in Western Australia for the 2022 federal election.

Perrottet became NSW Premier in October and said his government would pursue a new GST distribution scheme. However, Morrison (who became leader of the federal Liberals and Prime Minister in August 2018) and Labor opposition leader Anthony Albanese both said they would not consider changing the formula implemented in 2018. McGowan drew some media attention after joking he would take a spear to meetings with Perrottet during a press conference in which he dismissed the NSW complaint.

South Australia (SA) also announced an inquiry into the distribution formula, which gained the support of the Victorian and Tasmanian state governments. Treasurer Rob Lucas said the state government wanted the "no worse-off" guarantee to be permanent and the Productivity Commission inquiry scheduled for 2027 to be brought forward.

Ahead of the 2022 federal election, the CGC produced a report which concluded all states except WA would receive less under the new system than the old once the "no worse-off guarantee" expires in 2027. Pallas claimed the new distribution system "has nothing to do with making the GST fairer and everything to do with winning the west at the election." New SA Premier Peter Malinauskas also joined the criticism. At the federal level, both parties committed to maintaining the new system.

In late 2022, McGowan announced the creation of a state wealth fund backed by WA's mining sector, a policy that drew criticism from shadow treasurer Steve Thomas who believed it would justify demands to overturn the GST reform. 

Prior to the 2023 NSW state election, Perottet again criticised the GST arrangement, again suggesting a review of the distribution. McGowan responded by stating that WA received less than it contributed while NSW received more than it contributed, saying "how that is unfair on NSW is a mystery to anyone with a brain".

References 

Taxation in Australia
Turnbull Government
Morrison Government
2017 in Australian politics
2018 in Australian politics
2021 in Australian politics
2022 in Australian politics